Danny Levan(), is a pop, dance and house music singer and songwriter born in Bulgaria in the city of Burgas as Daniel Dimitrov Rusev with Greek roots from his mother's side. Realized many projects in Bulgaria and around the world.

Musical career
Levan began his career using his birth name. Afterwards, he changed his name to the stage name "Danny Levan." In 2008, he released his first song, "Something New".

In the same year, he released the songs "Can We," "Pink Days," and "I Want from You" (a duet with another singer, Leo, from the reality show Big Brother).

In 2009, with the composer Martin Biolchev, Levan made the song "Infuse Me" (literally Pour yourself into me). "Infuse Me" was aired live on the nationwide TV channel bTV on the comedy show "The Comedians." At the end of 2009, he shot two videos, for the songs "Something New" and "Infuse Me," with him as director, which officially went online in 2010. Many concerts and television and radio appearances followed. However, from 2011 to 2013, he paused his musical career. In October 2011, because of an invitation from the leader of the Bulgarian party "SEK," Danny Levan became a candidate for Burgas municipal elections counselor for 2011.

At the same time, from 2011 to 2013, he was sent several contracts for Bulgarian and foreign musical companies and labels, but did not accept any of them.

In 2013, he created a self-written song, "Body Shaker" with Bate Pesho, which was nominated for the first musical awards from BOX TV, the national musical television. The video to the song was filmed by Bashmotion and went live during August of the same year.

In 2014, DJ Diass wrote a song for Danny entitled "Losing track of time", which is released by "Crossworld Records" London around the world.

A month later, again with his lyrics, together with DJ Gabriel Slick, he created the album "Patterns", which includes 5 songs and 2 remixes. The album is released worldwide again under the auspices of the English label from London "Crossworld Records". The song "Patterns" is a single from the album. In Bulgaria, 7 weeks are held in first place in the ranking of the top 40 of "Alpha Radio".

Alpha Radio's single "Patterns" became the most broadcast song of 2014, according to the radio station.

At the same time, Levan created a new EP with music producers The Moochers from Italy. The album is titled "Scars of Love" (in Bulgarian: Белези от любов), containing 3 songs and 1 remix, again after the lyrics of the artist.

Scars of Love is released by King Street Records – a label from New York City.

The single "Chance for Love" to the music of Svetlin Kaslev – Starlight was released on 14 February 2014 in a duet with Nells. The video for the song is the work of the director Alexander Molov.

During this period he received an inquiry from the Greek singer Marina Sazi for a cover of his song "Body Shaker".

Subsequently, the singer's team invited him to make the song in a duet. In May of that year, they shot a video for "Body Shaker" together. The song and video are distributed by Universal Music Group directly in Vevo and in over 25 countries around the world.

He received a contract offer from Universal Music Group – Minos EMI, which he accepted and in June 2014 signed a contract with the music company.

On 1 December 2014 was released Danny Levan's first solo single "Don't Say Goodbye" with the music giant Universal Music Group – Minos EMI. The video was uploaded by the music giant with its premiere at VEVO after three months of work on the project. The song climbed to No. 1 in the top 40, Spain, for several weeks in a row.

On 10 December 2014, Danny Levan received the "Pop Artist of the Year" award at the fifth annual media awards for fashion, style and show business – Varna.

On 7 June 2016 he presents his duet song with the pop-folk singer Anelia – "In my mind". The video was shot in the Turkish resort of Alanya. The director of the video is Pavlin Ivanov. The duo is released by the music company Payner.

On 15 May 2018, the video for the single "Let's do it" is released. The song is based on music by Daniel Ganev and lyrics by Danny Levan. The video was recorded in the singer's hometown – Burgas. The video is released by the music label Facing The Sun.

Hook Music – Greece releases the single Love me on replay on 1 December 2018.

On 25 April 2020 the video for the single "There's More"is released. The song is based on music by Kaloyan 'Stanx' Stanev from OnTheBeat Production and Danny Levan. The text is by Danny Levan. The video was shot in Utopia Forest, Burgas.

On 30 July 2020, the video for the single "Are Begay" is released. The song is based on music by Kaloyan 'Stanx' Stanev from OnTheBeat Production and Danny Levan. The text is by Danny Levan. The video was shot at Camping Lausanne, Aheloy with the participation of gymnast Jenina Stefanova.

A month and a half after the realization of the single "Are Begai" on 14 October 2020 Danny Levan surprised his fans with a new single and video entitled "Is that you". The song has a modern dance house sound. The music is by Hrisi Pachalova and Kiril Dimitrov, the lyrics are by Angel Prodanov and Hrisi Pachalova, and the arrangement is by Pancho Karamanski. The director of the video is Pavlin Ivanov – Bashmotion, for which the sports complex of the Technical University in Sofia was used as a filming site. The video also features dancers from "NEXT Generation" with choreographer Rositsa Terziyska.

On 27 October 2021, Danny Levan's single "DANCE" was officially released on the music streaming platforms. Although the song is titled "Dance" the lyrics are in Bulgarian. The team in the making of the song is about the same as the single "Is that you". The new team member is Anastasia Mavrodieva - songwriter.

On 22 February 2023, Danny Levan's latest single "Как си" (in English: How are you?) and his official video was officially released on the music streaming platforms. The music and the arrangement are by Ivan Tishev, the lyrics are by Anastasia Mavrodieva. The director of the video is Pavlin Ivanov – Bashmotion

Videos 
Danny Levan – Something New (in Bulgarian – Нещо ново / Neshto novo)  – 2010
Danny Levan – Infuse Me (in Bulgarian – Влей се в мен / Vley se v men) -2010 
Danny Levan – Body Shaker – 1 July 2013
Danny Levan ft. Starlight – Overheating (in Bulgarian – Прегрявам / Pregryavam) – December 2013
Danny Levan ft. Nells – A chance for love (in Bulgarian – Шанс на любовта / Shans na lyubovta)- 14 February 2014 
Sazi & Danny Levan – Body Shaker – in May 2014:
Gabriel Slick ft. Danny Levan – Patterns – 22 February 2014 
Danny Levan – Don`t say goodbye – in 1 December 2014:
Danny Levan – Rapture – 12 July 2015
Danny Levan & Анелия – В моя ум – 7 June 2016
Danny Levan – Нека го направим (in English – Let's Do it) – 15 August 2018
Danny Levan – Love me on replay – 1 November 2018
Danny Levan & Bobby – Гранатомета – 29 May 2019
Danny Levan – Има още (in English – There's more) – 25 April 2020
Danny Levan – Аре бегай – 30 July 2020
Danny Levan – Ти ли си (in English – Is that you) – 14 October 2020
Danny Levan – Dance – 28 April 2022
Danny Levan – Как си (in English – How are you?) – 22 February 2023

 Single 

 Album Влей се в мен/ Vley se v men – Infuse Me BG 2011 PATTERNS 2014SCARS OF LOVE''' 2014

References

Sources 
 Mika magazine 
 Fame 
 Hot News 
 Fame 
 Novini  
 Tv7 
 Bulgaria Now
 Radio NJOY
 Like a lady
 Hit Channel – GREECE 
 Hit Channel – GREECE

External links 
 Official Website

1990 births
Living people
21st-century Bulgarian male singers
Bulgarian singer-songwriters
Bulgarian people of Greek descent